ESP Tom Araya is an electric bass guitar model distributed by ESP Guitars, as customized by Chilean-American musician Tom Araya.

Araya originally discovered ESP when his Slayer bandmates Jeff Hanneman and Kerry King used the company's guitars; the former had his own signature model. He was approached by ESP, who wanted to also make him a signature bass. Araya approved under the condition the bass he plays is the same a fan could purchase at a music store. He wanted the lower-price models to be similar in quality to the high-end models, reasoning "not all the fans can afford a bass that costs an arm and a leg". As of November 2018, ESP has three Araya basses, the top model's list price is $4,499 while the others are $999 and $499.

Among other customization features, Araya wanted the bass to have an unusually thin neck which he prefers to accommodate his playing style.

References

See also
ESP Tom Araya (disambiguation)
Tom Araya
Slayer
ESP Guitars

ESP electric bass guitars

es:ESP Tom Araya
pt:ESP Tom Araya